Riccardo Materazzi (born 15 June 1963 in Brussels, Région de Bruxelles-Capitale) is a retired male middle distance runner from Italy.

He competed for his home country at the 1984 Summer Olympics in Los Angeles, California. Materazzi won the silver medal in the men's 1,500 metres at the 1984 European Indoor Championships in Gothenburg, Sweden.

International competitions

National titles
Riccardo Materazzi has won 2 times the individual national championship.
2 wins in the 1500 metres indoor (1984, 1985)

References

External links
 

1963 births
Living people
Italian male middle-distance runners
Athletes (track and field) at the 1984 Summer Olympics
Olympic athletes of Italy
Sportspeople from Brussels